Josefine Adolfsson, (born 27 October 1973) is a Swedish author and producer both in films and radio. She writes books that borders between fiction and reality. She studied at Dramatiska Institutet in Stockholm and has published the book Kårnulf was here, Farlighetslagen, Ingens mamma and SWAT. She has also worked for several productions  on Sveriges Radio, amongst them Magical Misery Tour and Sällskapslekar. In 2001, she was awarded the Prix Europa award for the documentary Titta inte sådär på mig. She along with Lisa Aschan she produced the film Apflickorna, the film won the Dragon Award Best Nordic Film in 2011. At the 2011 Guldbagge Awards she along with Aschan won a award for Best Script. 

Adolfsson was the founder of Lava at the Kulturhuset in Stockholm, and in 2002 she was awarded the Dagens Nyheter award Gulddraken for her work.

Bibliography
Adolfsson, Josefine (2004). Kårnulf was here: en hembygdsskildring i fyra delar och två samtal. Stockholm: Atlas. Libris 9507675. 
Adolfsson, Josefine (2009). Farlighetslagen. Stockholm: Bokförlaget Atlas. Libris 11456078. 
Adolfsson, Josefine; Adolfsson Josefine, Andersson Lena, Boijsen Gabriella, Kracht Gunilla, Lindqvist Anna Sol, López Natacha, Magnusson Jane, Rabe Annina, Rahimi *Faranak, Sjögren Katarina, Stenberg Birgitta, Yngvesson Susanne Wigorts, Åberg Sofie (2013). Ingens mamma : tolv kvinnor om barnfrihet. Bokförlaget Atlas. Libris 14221456. 
Adolfsson, Josefine, Sandlund Fia-Stina (2016). SWAT - She's wild again tonight : en operation i August Strindbergs "Fröken Julie".

Productions for radio 
Jourhavande kompis 2000
Titta inte sådär på mig 2001
Sällskapslekar 2001
Magical Misery Tour 2001
Sveriges fetradio 2002
Läget 2003
Om vi drömmer 2004

Filmography
Apflickorna 2011[4]
She's Wild Again Tonight 2015

References

Living people
21st-century Swedish writers
1973 births
Swedish women writers